The INWO Book is a book published by Steve Jackson Games (SJG) in 1995 about the company's satirical collectible card game (CCG) Illuminati: New World Order.

Description
With CCGs on the rise in 1994 following the release of Magic: The Gathering, Steve Jackson Games published Illuminati: New World Order (INWO), a CCG with complex rules that won the 1994 Origins Award for Best Card Game. The game was immensely popular — Jackson reported that "pre-sales alone were more than 10 times as much as for any game we'd done before."

The following year, SJG published a guidebook about INWO titled The INWO Book, subtitled "Being a Compendium of Lore, Lies, Damned Lies and Statistics concerning the New World Order of the Il;luminated Masters." The 152-page paperback was written by Steve Jackson, with illustrations by John Kovalic, David Martin, Shea Ryan, and Dan Smith. 

The book contains 
Steve Jackson's production reports about planning sessions leading up to the publication of the game
complete and updated rules, as well as optional rules and variant games
official tournament rules
suggested strategies and deck builds
an overview of every card published in the initial print run
a complete card list
the various printing styles for rare and ordinary cards

Reception
In the October 1995 edition of Dragon (#222), Rick Swan noted that the book provides "everything you want to know" about INWO, and called it a revealing read.

References

Books about collectible card games